De'Vante Bausby (born January 15, 1993) is an American football cornerback for the Arlington Renegades of the XFL. He played college football for the Pittsburg State Gorillas and has been a member of several teams in the National Football League, Alliance of American Football, and United States Football League.

Professional career

Kansas City Chiefs
Bausby signed with the Kansas City Chiefs as an undrafted free agent. He broke his collarbone during mini-camp in June 2015 and was released by the Chiefs with an injury designation.

Chicago Bears
On December 22, 2015 after completing the rehab from his collarbone injury, Bausby was signed to the Bears' practice squad and signed a reserve/futures contract with the team on January 4. He was released on September 3, 2016, and was signed to the practice squad the next day. He was promoted to the active roster on October 10, 2016. He was released on November 19, 2016 but was re-signed three days later. He was released again on December 13, 2016 and re-signed to the practice squad. He signed a reserve/future contract with the Bears on January 3, 2017.

On May 1, 2017, Bausby was waived by the Bears.

Kansas City Chiefs (second stint)
On May 3, 2017, Bausby signed with the Kansas City Chiefs. Bausby was waived on September 2, 2017.

Philadelphia Eagles
On September 12, 2017, Bausby was signed to the Philadelphia Eagles' practice squad. With Bausby on the practice squad, the Eagles defeated the New England Patriots in Super Bowl LII. On February 13, 2018, Bausby re-signed with the Eagles.

On September 1, 2018, Bausby was waived by the Eagles and was signed to the practice squad the next day. He was released on September 11, 2018. He was re-signed to the practice squad on November 5, 2018. He was promoted to the active roster on November 17, 2018. On December 24, 2018, he was waived by the Eagles.

San Antonio Commanders
On January 9, 2019, Bausby signed with the San Antonio Commanders of the Alliance of American Football (AAF). In the season opener against the San Diego Fleet, Bausby picked off quarterback Mike Bercovici in the third quarter. At the time of the league's suspension, Bausby was leading the AAF in pass breakups and interceptions, a number which did not include a highlight 99-yard "pick 2" play that helped seal his team's win in week 7.

Denver Broncos
After the AAF suspended football operations, Bausby signed with the Denver Broncos on April 8, 2019. He earned a spot on the Broncos roster as the fourth cornerback on the depth chart. In week 5 versus the Chargers, Bausby suffered a neck injury that left him immobile for a short period of time after an accidental collision with Alexander Johnson. He was placed on injured reserve on October 8, 2019.

Bausby re-signed with the Broncos on March 19, 2020. He was released on September 5, 2020, but was signed to the practice squad the following day. He was promoted to the active roster on September 16, 2020 and was named the fourth cornerback behind Michael Ojemudia, Bryce Callahan, and Essang Bassey. He was released on October 24 when A. J. Bouye came off injured reserve.

Arizona Cardinals
On October 30, 2020, Bausby signed with the Arizona Cardinals. After playing one game versus the Miami Dolphins, he was waived by the Cardinals who planned to place him on their practice squad.

Denver Broncos (second stint)
On November 10, 2020, Bausby was claimed off waivers by the Broncos.

Las Vegas Raiders
On June 17, 2021, Bausby signed with the Las Vegas Raiders. On August 16, 2021, Bausby was released by the Raiders.

New England Patriots
On October 27, 2021, Bausby was signed to the New England Patriots practice squad.

New Jersey Generals
Bausby was selected with the third pick of the eighth round of the 2022 USFL Draft by the New Jersey Generals of the United States Football League (USFL).

Washington Commanders
Bausby signed with the Washington Commanders on August 4, 2022, but was released on August 16.

Arlington Renegades 
On November 17, 2022, Bausby was drafted by the Arlington Renegades of the XFL. Against the Vegas Vipers in week one, he recorded a pick six with almost four minutes left in the game to put the Renegades up 22–14. That score and the team's eventual stop on the 2-point conversion attempt by Luis Perez propelled them to a 22–20 win.

References

1993 births
Living people
American football cornerbacks
Arizona Cardinals players
Arlington Renegades players
Chicago Bears players
Denver Broncos players
Kansas City Chiefs players
Las Vegas Raiders players
New England Patriots players
Philadelphia Eagles players
Pittsburg State Gorillas football players
Players of American football from Kansas City, Missouri
San Antonio Commanders players
New Jersey Generals (2022) players
Washington Commanders players